Ouvrage Schoenenbourg is a Maginot Line fortification. It is located on the territory of the communes of Hunspach, Schœnenbourg and Ingolsheim, in the French département of Bas-Rhin, forming part of the Fortified Sector of Haguenau, facing Germany. At the east end of the Alsace portion of the Maginot Line, its neighbour is the gros ouvrage Hochwald. It is the largest such fortification open to the public in Alsace. Officially recorded as an historical monument, it retains all its original structural elements. Schoenenbourg was heavily bombarded during the Battle of France in 1940, receiving more enemy ordnance than any other position in France, with no significant damage. In 1945, retreating German troops used explosives to destroy much of the ouvrage. After the war it was fully repaired and placed back into service as part of a programme to use Maginot fortifications to resist a potential Warsaw Pact advance through Europe. By the 1970s the plan had lost favour and funding, and Schoenenboug was abandoned.  In 1987 a local organisation undertook Schoenenbourg's preservation, and today it is open to public visitation.

Design and construction 
The site was surveyed by CORF (Commission d'Organisation des Régions Fortifiées), the Maginot Line's design and construction agency; Schoenenbourg was approved for construction in June 1931. The gros ouvrage was intended to receive an additional turret in a second phase of construction, never pursued. Schoenenbourg is arranged as a typical gros ouvrage, with separate entrances for munitions and personnel almost  behind the closely grouped main combat blocks. Schoenenbourg lacks the large "M1" central magazine characteristic of most gros ouvrages.

Initial plans were on a smaller scale. The 1929 original proposal was for a petit ouvrage, six blocks armed with machine guns and 75 mm guns. Blocks were added to the design until the gros ouvrage emerged. Costs in 1931 were estimated at 41.2 million francs. Construction uncovered difficulties with the foundations, resulting in the widespread use of piles under the blocks to stabilise their support, a unique solution in the Line. The major work was completed in 1935, and equipment and armament were fitted in 1936 and 1937. Final completion took place in 1938, marked by difficulties with drainage of water infiltration.

Description 
The work is composed of eight blocks, with six combat blocks including two casemate blocks, a personnel entrance block and an ammunition entrance block. The underg\round barracks and utility areas are located just inside the personnel entry. The ouvrage was served by electrified   narrow-gauge railways that branched from a line paralleling the front and connecting to supply depots. The rail lines ran directly into the munitions entry of the ouvrage and all the way out to the combat blocks.
Block 1: Infantry casemate on two levels, with one twin machine gun/47 mm anti-tank gun embrasure (JM/AC47), one flanking twin machine gun and two automatic rifle cloches (GFM), as well as an emergency exit.  This block was particularly difficult to supply with ammunition, since it lacked a hoist, and all ordnance had to be carried by the troops.
Block 2: Infantry block with one retractable twin machine gun turret and one GFM cloche.  As with Block 1, no ammunition hoist was provided.
Block 3: Artillery block with one retractable twin 75 mm gun turret and one GFM cloche.
Block 4: Artillery block, identical to Block 3, with an additional observation cloche (VDP).
Block 5: Artillery block with one retractable twin 81 mm mortar turret, one GFM block and one grenade launcher cloche (LG) (never armed).
Block 6: Infantry casemate, identical to Block 1, with a single GFM cloche.
Block 7: Ammunition entry with two hoists of  capacity, two GFM cloches, three FM automatic rifle embrasures and one JM/AC47 embrasure.  Radio communications were also available at this location.
Block 8: Personnel entry with one GFM cloche, one LG cloche, one JM/AC47 embrasure and two FM automatic rifle embrasures. Due to explosive demolition by the Germans in 1944, the block was reconstructed in 1950.

The generating plant comprised four Sulzer engines of  each.

Casemates and shelters 
A series of detached casemates and infantry shelters are in the vicinity of Schoenenbourg, including
 Casemate de Breitenacker Nord: SIngle block with one JM/AC37 embrasure, one twin machine gun embrasure  and a GFM cloche.
 Casemate de Breitenacker Sud: SIngle block with one JM/AC37 embrasure, one twin machine gun embrasure  and a GFM cloche. Breitenacker Nord and Sud are linked by an underground gallery.
 Abri de Grasserloch: Subsurface abri-caverne with two GFM cloches.
 Abri de Schoenenbourg: Surface abri with two GFM cloches.
 Casemate d'Ingolscheim Ouest: SIngle block with one JM/AC37 embrasure, one twin machine gun embrasure  and a GFM cloche.
 Casemate d'Ingolscheim Est: SIngle block with one JM/AC37 embrasure, one twin machine gun embrasure  and a GFM cloche.

Manning 
The 1939 manning of the ouvrage under the command of Commandant Reynier comprised 491 men and 17 officers of the 22nd Fortress Infantry Regiment and the 156th Position Artillery Regiment. The units were under the umbrella of the 5th Army, Army Group 2. Interval troops covering the areas between and outside the fortifications were assigned to the 16th and 70th Infantry Divisions, 12th Corps. The nearby Casernement de Drachenbronn provided peacetime above-ground barracks and support services to Schoenenbourg and other positions in the area.

History 
See Fortified Sector of Haguenau for a broader discussion of the Haguenau sector of the Maginot Line.

1940 
The fortification at Schoenenbourg is the one that saw the most combat between September 1939 and June 1940.  Over this period, over 17,000 shells were fired from the fort, and it was itself the target of over 3000 shells and 160 bombs.  Schoenenbourg was in action against the German 146th Infantry Division, which applied pressure along the Line. On 19 June 1940, German Stukas attacked Schoenenbourg and other ouvrages, returning on the 20th and 21st.  The attacks on the 21st were joined by a bombardment with 420 mm siege mortars, lasting three days.  The bombardment cracked walls, but did not disable the position. Schoenenbourg fired during this period in support of nearby casemates, not seriously affected by the bombardments. Schoenenbourg's turrets were retracted to receive the heavy shells, and raised during the lengthy reloading period for counterbattery fire. The inventory of German ordnance fired against Schoenenbourg was assessed after the armistice, and found to comprise 160 aerial bombs, 50 42 cm shells, 33 28 cm shells, and approximately 3000 smaller projectiles, the most ammunition used against any fortification in France. The final surrender of Schoenenbourg was effected on 1 July 1940, in accordance with the terms of the Second Compiègne armistice. Following the surrender Schoenenbourg was used as a backdrop for propaganda films and as an indoctrination center for Hitler Youth.

1945 
No fighting took place in the area of Schoenenbourg during the American advances of 1945, but the retreating Germans of the 245th Infantry Division caused extensive damage in March, using explosives to wreck the entrances and turrets, along with a number of nearby casemates. The U.S. 36th Infantry Division took possession of the damaged ouvrage on 20 March 1945.

Cold War 
In  the 1950s interest in  the Maginot Line was renewed. In 1951, Lembach, Four-à-Chaux, Hochwald and Schoenenbourg were designated the Môle de Haguenau, a point of resistance against a potential invasion by forces of the Warsaw Pact. Lembach was repaired and put in a state of readiness in 1951–52. Wartime damage was repaired. The reconstructed entries took on a form  that was modified from the original design, using the old foundations. By the late 1950s interest in fixed fortifications was waning after  France developed a nuclear deterrent.  The money needed to maintain and upgrade the fortifications was diverted for the nuclear programs. Schoenenbourg was not manned or maintained after the early 1970s The gallery system was used by the army for training until 2001, and the surface hosted three field emplacements for anti-aircraft missiles.

Current condition 

In 1987 the French Army allowed the Association des Amis de la Ligne Maginot d'Alsace (Alsace Association of Friends of the Maginot Line) to conduct tours of the fortification. From 1981 the group has worked to restore Schoenenbourg. The information point for visitors is in Block 7, with self-guided tours.

The nearby Abri de Grasserloch may also be toured by prior arrangement. The Casemate d'Esch is operated by the same organisation. On 4 September 2001, Schoenenbourg was the first gros ouvrage to be sold by the Ministry of Defense to a local community.

See also 
 List of all works on Maginot Line
 Siegfried Line
 Atlantic Wall
 Czechoslovak border fortifications

Notes

Sources 
 This article incorporates text translated from the corresponding French Wikipedia article as of January 21, 2007.

References

Bibliography 
Allcorn, William. The Maginot Line 1928-45. Oxford: Osprey Publishing, 2003. 
Degon, André; Zylberyng, Didier, La Ligne Maginot: Guide des Forts à Visiter, Editions Ouest-France, 2014.  
Kaufmann, J.E. and Kaufmann, H.W. Fortress France: The Maginot Line and French Defenses in World War II, Stackpole Books, 2006. 
Kaufmann, J.E., Kaufmann, H.W., Jancovič-Potočnik, A. and Lang, P. The Maginot Line: History and Guide, Pen and Sword, 2011. 
Mary, Jean-Yves; Hohnadel, Alain; Sicard, Jacques. Hommes et Ouvrages de la Ligne Maginot, Tome 1. Paris, Histoire & Collections, 2001.  
Mary, Jean-Yves; Hohnadel, Alain; Sicard, Jacques. Hommes et Ouvrages de la Ligne Maginot, Tome 2. Paris, Histoire & Collections, 2003.  
Mary, Jean-Yves; Hohnadel, Alain; Sicard, Jacques. Hommes et Ouvrages de la Ligne Maginot, Tome 3. Paris, Histoire & Collections, 2003.  
Mary, Jean-Yves; Hohnadel, Alain; Sicard, Jacques. Hommes et Ouvrages de la Ligne Maginot, Tome 5. Paris, Histoire & Collections, 2009.

External links 

 Fortress Schoenenbourg
 
 The Schoenenbourg Fort at Traces of War
 Ouvrage d'artillerie de Schœnenbourg at wikimaginot.eu 
 L'ouvrage de Schœnenbourg en Alsace at maginot.free.fr 
 L'ouvrage du Schœnenbourg at alsacemaginot.com 
 Schœnenbourg (gros ouvrage du) at ortiff.be 
 Video of Schœnenbourg 

Fortified sector of Haguenau
Môle de Haguenau
Maginot Line
World War II museums in France
Monuments historiques of Bas-Rhin